The Dawson Creek Kodiaks are a Junior "B" Ice Hockey team based in Dawson Creek, British Columbia, Canada. They are members of the North West Junior Hockey League (NWJHL). They play their home games at Dawson Creek Memorial Arena.  The team was known as the Dawson Creek Jr. Canucks from 1994 to 2021, but adopted the current name ahead of the 2021-22 season.

Season-by-season record
Note: GP = Games played, W = Wins, L = Losses, OTL = Overtime Losses, Pts = Points, GF = Goals for, GA = Goals against, PIM = Penalties in minutes

External links
Official website of the Dawson Creek Kodiaks

References

Ice hockey teams in British Columbia
Dawson Creek
1994 establishments in British Columbia
Ice hockey clubs established in 1994